A fix-up (or fixup) is a novel created from several short fiction stories that may or may not have been initially related or previously published. The stories may be edited for consistency, and sometimes new connecting material, such as a frame story or other interstitial narration, is written for the new work. The term was coined by the science fiction writer A. E. van Vogt, who published several fix-ups of his own, including The Voyage of the Space Beagle, but the practice (if not the term) exists outside of science fiction. The use of the term in science fiction criticism was popularised by the first (1979) edition of The Encyclopedia of Science Fiction, edited by Peter Nicholls, which credited van Vogt with the creation of the term.
The name “fix-up” comes from the changes that the author needs to make in the original texts, to make them fit together as though they were a novel. Foreshadowing of events from the later stories may be jammed into an early chapter of the fix-up, and character development may be interleaved throughout the book. Contradictions and inconsistencies between episodes are usually worked out.

Some fix-ups in their final form are more of a short story cycle or composite novel, rather than a traditional novel with a single main plotline. Examples are Ray Bradbury's The Martian Chronicles, and Isaac Asimov's I, Robot both of which read as a series of short stories which may share plot threads and characters, but which still act as self-contained stories. By contrast, van Vogt's The Weapon Shops of Isher is structured like a continuous novel, although it incorporates material from three previous van Vogt short stories.

Fix-ups became an accepted practice in American publishing during the 1950s, when science fiction and fantasy—once published primarily in magazines—increasingly began appearing in book form. Large book publishers like Doubleday and Simon & Schuster entered the market, greatly increasing demand for fiction. Authors created new manuscripts from old stories, to sell to publishers. Algis Budrys in 1965 described fixups as a consequence of the lack of good supply during the "bad years for quality" of the mid-1950s, although citing The Martian Chronicles and Clifford D. Simak's City as exceptions.

Examples

Science fiction and fantasy

 Slan (1946)  by A. E. van Vogt
 The Book of Ptath (1947) by A. E. van Vogt
 The World of Null-A (1948) by A. E. van Vogt
 Triplanetary by E. E. Smith
 The Voyage of the Space Beagle (1950) by A. E. van Vogt
 The Martian Chronicles (1950) by Ray Bradbury
 I, Robot (1951) by Isaac Asimov
 City (1952) by Clifford D. Simak
 The Mixed Men (1952) by A. E. van Vogt
 More Than Human (1953) by Theodore Sturgeon
 Mutant (1953) by Henry Kuttner and C. L. Moore (as Lewis Padgett)
 The Weapon Shops of Isher (1954) by A. E. van Vogt
 Earthman, Come Home (1955) by James Blish
 Men, Martians and Machines (1955) by Eric Frank Russell
 Hell's Pavement (1955) by Damon Knight
 Lest We Forget Thee, Earth (1958) by Robert Silverberg (as Calvin M. Knox)
 The Outward Urge (1959) by John Wyndham  (as John Wyndham and Lucas Parkes)
 A Canticle for Leibowitz (1959) by Walter Miller, Jr.
 The War Against the Rull (1959) by A. E. van Vogt
 The Great Explosion (1962) by Eric Frank Russell
 Hothouse (1962) by Brian W. Aldiss
 Savage Pellucidar (1963) by Edgar Rice Burroughs
 Stormbringer (1965) by Michael Moorcock
 Rogue Ship (1965) by A. E. van Vogt
 The Dying Earth (1950) by Jack Vance
 The Eyes of the Overworld (1966) by Jack Vance
 Counter-Clock World (1967) by Philip K. Dick
 Pavane (1968) by Keith Roberts
 The Silkie (1969) by A. E. van Vogt
 The Ship Who Sang (1969) by Anne McCaffrey
 Quest for the Future (1970) by A. E. van Vogt
 Half Past Human (1971) by T. J. Bass
 Operation Chaos (1971) by Poul Anderson
 Puzzle of the Space Pyramids (1971) by Eando Binder
 To Your Scattered Bodies Go (1971) by Philip Jose Farmer
 The Fabulous Riverboat (1971) by Philip Jose Farmer
 The World Inside (1971) by Robert Silverberg
 334 (1972) by Thomas M. Disch
 The Godmakers (1972) by Frank Herbert
 To Ride Pegasus (1973) by Anne McCaffrey
 A World Out of Time (1976) by Larry Niven
 In the Ocean of Night (1977) by Gregory Benford
 The Mercenary (1977) by Jerry Pournelle
 If the Stars are Gods (1977) by Gregory Benford and Gordon Eklund
 Born to Exile (1978) by Phyllis Eisenstein
 Space War Blues (1978) by Richard A. Lupoff
 Catacomb Years (1979) by Michael Bishop
 The World and Thorinn (1981) by Damon Knight
 Windhaven (1981) by George R. R. Martin and Lisa Tuttle
 The Dark Tower: The Gunslinger (1982) by Stephen King
 The Crucible of Time (1983) by John Brunner
 Icehenge (1984) by Kim Stanley Robinson
 Emergence (1984) by David R. Palmer
 The Postman (1985) by David Brin
 Saturnalia (1986) by Grant Callin
 Tuf Voyaging (1986) by George R. R. Martin
 Life During Wartime (1987) by Lucius Shepard
 A Different Flesh (1988) by Harry Turtledove
 Prince of Mercenaries (1989) by Jerry Pournelle
 Mirabile (1991) by Janet Kagan
 Crashlander (1994) by Larry Niven
 Amnesia Moon (1995) by Jonathan Lethem (fix-up of all previously unpublished stories)
 Vacuum Diagrams (1997) by Stephen Baxter
 Kirinyaga (1998) by Mike Resnick
 Rainbow Mars (1999) by Larry Niven
 From the Dust Returned (2001) by Ray Bradbury
 Coyote (2002) by Allen Steele
 Sister Alice (2003) by Robert Reed
 Roma Eterna (2003) by Robert Silverberg
 The Carpet Makers (2005) by Andreas Eschbach
 Accelerando (2005) by Charles Stross
 From the Files of the Time Rangers (2005) by Richard Bowes
 Central Station (2016) by Lavie Tidhar
 Driftwood (2020) by Marie Brennan

Other genres

 Sunshine Sketches of a Little Town (1912) by Stephen Leacock
 The Inimitable Jeeves (1923) by P. G. Wodehouse
 The Big Four (1927) by Agatha Christie
 The Red Pony (1937) by John Steinbeck
 The Unvanquished (1938) by William Faulkner
 The Big Sleep (1939), Farewell My Lovely (1940) and The Lady in the Lake (1943) by Raymond Chandler
 Report on England, November 1940 by Ralph Ingersoll
 Go Down, Moses (1942) by William Faulkner
 Dandelion Wine (1957) by Ray Bradbury
 Lives of Girls and Women (1971) by Alice Munro
 Who Do You Think You Are? (1978) by Alice Munro
 The Things They Carried (1990) by Tim O'Brien
 Green Shadows, White Whale (1992) by Ray Bradbury
 Trainspotting (1993) by Irvine Welsh
 Haunted (2005) by Chuck Palahniuk
 A Visit from the Goon Squad (2010) by Jennifer Egan
 The Seven Wonders (2012) by Steven Saylor

See also

 Clip show
 Retroactive continuity

References
 

Writing 
Novel forms
Short stories
Science fiction terminology